Pearly mussel may refer to:

See also
 Pearly (disambiguation)
 Mussel

Mollusc common names